The 1957 Campeonato Ecuatoriano de Fútbol was the first time a football tournament was held to determine a national champion in Ecuador. Prior to this tournament, teams competed exclusively in one of two regional leagues, the Campeonato Profesional Interandinos (for clubs in Quito and Ambato) and the Campeonato Profesional de Fútbol de Guayaquil (for clubs in Guayaquil). Emelec from Guayaquil won the tournament and became the first Ecuadorian football champion.

Qualified teams

Standings

Results

References

Ecuadorian Serie A seasons
1957 in Ecuadorian sport
Ecu